Central High School is a public high school in Norton, Virginia. The school traces its origins back to J. J. Kelly High School and Pound High School, founded in 1953. It is part of the Wise County Public Schools system. It is a consolidated school, created by merging the two aforementioned schools in 2011. The mascot for Central is the Warrior. The school's colors are red, silver, black, and white.  The Warriors compete in the Virginia High School League's 2A classification with other schools from around Southwest Virginia.  Students are offered courses in the Advanced Placement Program (AP), as well as the opportunity to receive college credit from the Virginia Community College System for courses taken on the Central campus.

History
Central High School was founded in August 2011. The school was formed from Pound High School and J. J. Kelly High School. The name came from the school's central location in Wise, the center of Wise County. Central's colors are a combination of the colors two schools that formed the school;  J. J. Kelly's colors were red and white, while Pound's were red, black, and white. From the school's founding until December 2013, the school was located at the old J.J. Kelly High School building in Wise. In January 2014, a new campus, featuring a new school building and athletic facilities, was completed in the nearby city of Norton, Virginia.

Athletics
Central High sports include cross country, volleyball, soccer, football, basketball, wrestling, Scholastic Bowl, One Act, track, tennis, softball, baseball, and forensics.

It has consistently seen success in both its sports and its activities. Central won the VHSL 2A state championship in girls basketball in 2013-14, 2014–15, 2016–17, 2017–18, and 2018-19. Central captured 3 more State Championships in 2015-16, winning in Forensics, One Act, and Scholastic Bowl; it also finished 2nd in girls tennis. That year, the school's Scholastic Bowl team competed and succeeded in various quiz bowl tournaments, won the state title undefeated and attended the 2016 PACE National Scholastics Championship.

The school won girls basketball and One Act once again in 2016-17, and also captured 2nd place in Scholastic Bowl and girls tennis. Its successes in VHSL activities have resulted in its winning of the VHSL 2A Wells Fargo Cup, awarded for cumulative excellence in VHSL activities (as opposed to the Wachovia Cup for athletics), for three consecutive years (2015-2017).

References

External links
School website

Public high schools in Virginia
Schools in Wise County, Virginia
Educational institutions established in 2011
Wise, Virginia
2011 establishments in Virginia